The Kentucky Broodmare of the Year is selected each year by the Kentucky Thoroughbred Owners and Breeders Association. The title is considered the highest honor an American thoroughbred broodmare can receive, as the majority of American breeding stock resides in Kentucky. It is a subjective vote, as opposed to the title for leading sire in North America that looks strictly at the earnings of the stallion's progeny in the given year.

Currently, a mare is eligible for consideration if one particular offspring, conceived and foaled in Kentucky, won a Grade I stakes race in the award year. Consideration may then also be given to previous foals, specifically the number of stakes winners produced and their earnings. The rules were more relaxed in the past, essentially requiring, as one bloodstock expert observed, only that "the mare be boarded in Kentucky."

Mares who have produced multiple graded stakes winners may also be given the informal title of "blue hen". Toussaud, the 2002 Kentucky Broodmare of the Year, is often referred to as a blue hen for producing four grade 1 winners (Chester House, Honest Lady, Chiselling and Belmont Stakes winner Empire Maker) from her first six foals.

Winners

The winners for each year and their most notable progeny are as follows:

 1946 - Bloodroot - Ancestor
 1947 - Potheen - Bewitch
 1948 - Our Page - Navy Page
 1949 - Easy Lass - Coaltown
 1950 - Hildene - Hill Prince, First Landing
 1951 - Alpenstock III - Ruhe
 1952 - Ace Card - One Count
 1953 - Gaga - Tom Fool
 1954 - Traffic Court - Hasty Road, Traffic Judge
 1955 - Iron Reward - Swaps
 1956 - Swoon - Swoon's Son
 1957 - Belle Jeep - Jewel's Reward
 1958 - Miss Disco - Bold Ruler
 1959 - Knight's Daughter - Round Table
 1960 - Siama - Bald Eagle
 1961 - Striking - Bases Full, Hitting Away, Batter Up, Glamour
 1962 - Track Medal - Outing Class
 1963 - Misty Morn‡ - Bold Lad, Successor
 1964 - Maid of Flight - Kelso
 1965 - Pocahontas - Tom Rolfe
 1966 - Juliet's Nurse - Gallant Romeo
 1967 - Kerala - Damascus
 1968 - Delta - Dike
 1969 - All Beautiful - Arts and Letters
 1970 - Levee - Shuvee
 1971 - Iberia - Riva Ridge
 1972 - Moment of Truth II - Convenience
 1973 - Somethingroyal - Secretariat, Sir Gaylord
 1974 - Cosmah - Halo, Tosmah 
 1975 - Shenanigans - Ruffian, Icecapade
 1976 - Gazala II - Youth
 1977 - Sweet Tooth - Alydar, Our Mims
 1978 - Primonetta - Cum Laude Laurie
 1979 - Smartaire - Quadratic, Smarten
 1980 - Key Bridge - Fort Marcy, Key to the Mint
 1981 - Natashka - Truly Bound
 1982 - Best In Show - Blush With Pride 
 1983 - Courtly Dee - Althea
 1984 - Hasty Queen II - Fit to Fight
 1985 - Dunce Cap II - Late Bloomer
 1986 - Too Bald - Exceller, Capote
 1987 - Banja Luka - Ferdinand
 1988 - Grecian Banner - Personal Ensign, Personal Flag
 1989 - Relaxing‡ - Easy Goer
 1990 - Kamar - Gorgeous
 1991 - Toll Booth - Plugged Nickle
 1992 - Weekend Surprise† - A.P. Indy, Summer Squall
 1993 - Glowing Tribute - Sea Hero
 1994 - Fall Aspen - Timber Country
 1995 - Northern Sunset (IRE) - St Jovite
 1996 - Personal Ensign - My Flag, Miners Mark, Traditionally
 1997 - Slightly Dangerous - Warning, Dushyantor
 1998 - In Neon - Sharp Cat, Royal Anthem
 1999 - Anne Campbell - Menifee, Desert Wine
 2000 - Primal Force - Awesome Again, Macho Uno
 2001 - Turko's Turn - Point Given
 2002 - Toussaud - Empire Maker, Chester House, Chiselling, Honest Lady
 2003 - Prospectors Delite - Mineshaft
 2004 - Dear Birdie - Birdstone, Bird Town
 2005 - Baby Zip - Ghostzapper, City Zip
 2006 - Cara Rafaela - Bernardini
 2007 - Better Than Honour† - Rags to Riches, Jazil
 2008 - Vertigineux - Zenyatta, Balance
 2009 - Sweet Life - Sweet Catomine, Life Is Sweet
 2010 - Liable - Blame
 2011 - Oatsee - Shackleford
 2012 - Lisa Danielle - Wise Dan
 2013 - Take Charge Lady - Will Take Charge, Take Charge Indy
2014 - Fun House - Untapable, Paddy O'Prado
2015 - Littleprincessemma - American Pharoah
2016 - Leslie's Lady - Beholder, Into Mischief, Mendelssohn
2017 - Lemons Forever - Forever Unbridled, Unbridled Forever
2018 - Stage Magic - Justify
2019 - Beyond the Waves – Bricks and Mortar
2020 - Drumette - Monomoy Girl and Mr. Monomoy
2021 - Indian Miss - Mitole and Hot Rod Charlie

† produced two American Classic winners
‡ was a Champion during racing career and produced a Champion

References

See also
 Leading sire in North America
 Leading broodmare sire in North America

 
Horse racing in the United States